Grewia tenax, called the phalsa cherry, white crossberry, raisin bush, gangara, gangu, or kanger, is a species of flowering plant in the family Malvaceae. It is native to Africa, from the Sahara to Tanzania and parts of southern Africa, the Arabian Peninsula, and on to the Indian Subcontinent. The ripe fruit is edible and is consumed by local peoples either fresh, dried, or powered in drinks.

Subtaxa
The following subspecies are currently accepted:
Grewia tenax subsp. makranica (Rech.f. & Esfand.) Browicz – Iran, Afghanistan, Pakistan
Grewia tenax subsp. tenax

References

tenax
Flora of North Africa
Flora of Burkina Faso
Flora of Mali
Flora of Mauritania
Flora of Nigeria
Flora of Niger
Flora of Senegal
Flora of Northeast Tropical Africa
Flora of East Tropical Africa
Flora of Socotra
Flora of Angola
Flora of Botswana
Flora of Namibia
Flora of the Caprivi Strip
Flora of Zimbabwe
Flora of Mauritius
Flora of Sinai
Flora of the Arabian Peninsula
Flora of Iran
Flora of Afghanistan
Flora of the Indian subcontinent
Plants described in 1912